Stenalia coeruleocephala is a beetle in the genus Stenalia of the family Mordellidae. It was described in 1952.

References

coeruleocephala
Beetles described in 1952